Bekenu (also known as Bekenu Bazaar or Bakenu) is a small fishing town near Miri, in Sarawak, Malaysia.

The town has a few rows of shophouses, a fish market, several places to eat, and a pleasant esplanade. The town square faces the Bekenu river, and many of the shophouses date from the 1930s.

The most serious recent flood in Bekenu was in 1962 when shops were flooded up to the first floor and people had to be rescued by fishermen in rowing boats.

Neighbouring settlements include:

References

Towns in Sarawak